The men's 4 x 100 metres relay at the 2018 World Para Athletics European Championships was held at the Friedrich-Ludwig-Jahn-Sportpark in Berlin from 20 to 26 August. 1 event will be held over this distance.

Medalists

See also
List of IPC world records in athletics

References

4 x 100 metres relay
2018 in men's athletics